This is a list of defunct airlines of Hong Kong covering British Hong Kong and the special administrative region of China.

See also
 List of airlines of Hong Kong
 List of airports in Hong Kong

References

Airlines
Airlines, defunct
Hong Kong